The 2nd North African Infantry Division was a French Army formation during World War II.

The Division was created in March 1936 and was dissolved in May 1940 following the invasion of France. The Division was commanded by Generals Fernand Lescanne (to January 1940) and Pierre Dame.

During the Battle of France in May 1940 the division was made up of the following units:

 11 Zouaves Regiment
 13 Algerian Tirailleurs Regiment
 22 Algerian Tirailleurs Regiment
 92 Reconnaissance Battalion
 40 North African Artillery Regiment
 240 North African Artillery Regiment.

It was an active division which existed during peacetime.  The Zouaves Regiments were made up from European settlers in Algeria and some recruited from France.  The other regiments were made up of native troops from Algeria.

References

North African Infantry Division, 2nd
Infantry divisions of France